John D. Carmack II (born August 20, 1970) is an American computer programmer and video game developer. He co-founded the video game company id Software and was the lead programmer of its 1990s games Commander Keen, Wolfenstein 3D, Doom, Quake, and their sequels. Carmack made innovations in 3D computer graphics, such as his Carmack's Reverse algorithm for shadow volumes. In 2013, he resigned from id Software to work full-time at Oculus VR as their CTO. In 2019, he reduced his role to Consulting CTO so he could allocate more time toward artificial general intelligence (AGI). In 2022, he left Oculus to work on his startup, Keen Technologies.

Biography

Early life
Carmack was born in Shawnee Mission, Kansas, the son of local television news reporter Stan Carmack. He grew up in the Kansas City metropolitan area, where he became interested in computers at an early age. He attended Shawnee Mission East High School in Prairie Village, Kansas and Raytown South High School in nearby Raytown, Missouri.

Carmack was introduced to video games with the 1978 shoot 'em up game Space Invaders in the arcades during a summer vacation as a child. The 1980 maze chase arcade game Pac-Man also left a strong impression on him. He cited Nintendo designer Shigeru Miyamoto as the game developer he most admired.

As reported in David Kushner's Masters of Doom, when Carmack was 14, he broke into a school to help a group of children steal Apple II computers. To gain entry to the building, Carmack concocted a sticky substance of thermite mixed with Vaseline that melted through the windows. However, an overweight accomplice struggled to get through the hole and instead opened the window, setting off a silent alarm and alerting police. Carmack was arrested and sent for psychiatric evaluation. He was sentenced to a year in a juvenile home. He attended the University of Missouri–Kansas City for two semesters before withdrawing to work as a freelance programmer.

Career
Softdisk, a computer company in Shreveport, Louisiana, hired Carmack to work on Softdisk G-S (an Apple IIGS publication), introducing him to John Romero and other future key members of id Software such as Adrian Carmack (not related). Later, Softdisk would place this team in charge of a new, but short-lived, bi-monthly game subscription product called Gamer's Edge for the IBM PC (DOS) platform. In 1990, while still at Softdisk, Carmack, Romero, and others created the first of the Commander Keen games, a series that was published by Apogee Software, under the shareware distribution model, from 1991 onwards. Afterwards, Carmack left Softdisk to co-found id Software.

Carmack has pioneered or popularized the use of many techniques in computer graphics, including "adaptive tile refresh" for Commander Keen, ray casting for Hovertank 3D, Catacomb 3-D, and Wolfenstein 3D, binary space partitioning which Doom became the first game to use, surface caching which he invented for Quake, Carmack's Reverse (formally known as z-fail stencil shadows) which he devised for Doom 3, and MegaTexture technology, first used in Enemy Territory: Quake Wars. Quake 3 popularized the fast inverse square root algorithm.

Carmack's engines have also been licensed for use in other influential first-person shooters such as Half-Life, Call of Duty and Medal of Honor. In 2007, when Carmack was on vacation with his wife, he ended up playing some games on his cellphone, and decided he was going to make a "good" mobile game.

On August 7, 2013, Carmack joined Oculus VR as their CTO. On November 22, 2013, he resigned from id Software to work full-time at Oculus VR. Carmack's reason for leaving was that id's parent company ZeniMax Media did not want to support Oculus Rift. Carmack's role at both companies later became central to a ZeniMax lawsuit against Oculus' parent company, Facebook, claiming that Oculus stole ZeniMax's virtual reality intellectual property. The trial jury absolved Carmack of liability, though Oculus and other corporate officers were held liable for trademark, copyright, and contract violations.

In February 2017, Carmack sued ZeniMax, claiming the company had refused to pay him the remaining $22.5 million owed to him from their purchase of id Software. In October 2018, Carmack stated that he and ZeniMax had reached an agreement and that "Zenimax has fully satisfied their obligations to me", ending the suit.

On November 13, 2019, Carmack stepped down from the Oculus CTO role to become a "Consulting CTO" in order to allocate more time to his work on artificial general intelligence (AGI). On August 19, 2022, Carmack announced that he has raised $20M for Keen Technologies, his new AGI company. On December 16, 2022, Carmack left Oculus to focus on Keen.

Workstyle 

Carmack has maintained a sixty-hour work week, working a 10-hour day, six days a week, throughout his career. He has spoken publicly about the importance of long hours of uninterrupted focus in his work. Not only does high intensity allow him to make progress more quickly, but long hours are also critical to maintaining a focused mindset over time. Despite working such a demanding schedule, he has never experienced burnout.

Carmack is also known for taking week-long programming retreats. These retreats involve a solitary, uninterrupted period away from his normal routine often sequestered in a random city and hotel. The goal of these retreats is to allow Carmack to operate at full cognitive capacity, tackling a specific, difficult problem or learning a new skill. The solitude and physical isolation of these retreats offer the perfect environment for deep focus and reflection, making them an essential part of Carmack's creative process.

Carmack was vocal about his frustration with the bureaucratic inefficiencies he encountered during his time at Meta. In his departure memo, he stated, "We have a ridiculous amount of people and resources, but we constantly self-sabotage and squander effort," he wrote. "I have never been able to kill stupid things before they cause damage, or set a direction and have a team actually stick to it."

Carmack subscribes to the philosophy that small, incremental steps are the fastest route to meaningful and disruptive innovation. He compares this approach to the "magic of gradient descent" where small steps using local information result in the best outcomes. According to Carmack, this principle is proven by his own experience, and he has observed this in many of the smartest people in the world. He states, "Little tiny steps using local information winds up leading to all the best answers."

Armadillo Aerospace

Around 2000, Carmack became interested in rocketry, a hobby of his youth. Reviewing how much money he was spending on customizing Ferraris, he began by giving financial support to a few local amateur engineers. Carmack funded the company, called Armadillo Aerospace, out of his own pocket, for "something north of a million dollars a year." The company of hobbyists made steady progress toward their goals of suborbital space flight and eventual orbital vehicles. In October 2008, Armadillo Aerospace competed in a NASA contest known as the Lunar Lander Challenge, winning first place in the Level 1 competition along with $350,000. In September 2009, they completed Level 2 and were awarded $500,000. The company went into "hibernation mode" in 2013.

According to Carmack, the work in the Aerospace industry is "simple" compared to the work he does in video games.

Open-source software
Carmack is an advocate of open-source software, and has repeatedly voiced his opposition to software patents, equating them to robbery. He has also contributed to open-source projects, such as starting the initial port of the X Window System to Mac OS X Server and working to improve the OpenGL drivers for Linux through the Utah GLX project.

Carmack released the source code for Wolfenstein 3D in 1995 and the Doom source code in 1997, first under a custom license and then under the GNU General Public License (GPL) in 1999. When the source code to Quake was leaked and circulated among the Quake community underground in 1997 after licensee Crack dot Com was hacked, a programmer unaffiliated with id Software named Greg Alexander used it to port Quake to Linux using SVGALib. As this was more feature rich than Dave Taylor's earlier X11 port, he sent the patches to Carmack. Instead of pursuing legal action, id Software used the patches as the foundation for a company-sanctioned Linux port maintained by new hire Zoid Kirsch, who later ported Quakeworld and Quake II to Linux as well.

id Software has since publicly released the source code to Quake in 1999, Quake 2 in 2001, Quake 3 in 2005 and lastly Doom 3 in 2011 (and later the BFG Edition in 2012). The source code for Hovertank 3D and Catacomb 3D (as well as Carmack's earlier Catacomb) was released in June 2014 by Flat Rock Software with Carmack's blessing. He has since expressed regret on using the copyleft GPL over the more permissive BSD license.

The release of id Tech 4 occurred despite patent concerns from Creative Labs over Carmack's reverse, while the original Doom source release shipped without music due to complications with the Cygnus Studios developed DMX library (which lead to the Linux version being selected for release). Carmack has since advised developers to be careful when utilizing middleware, noting how it can limit the possibilities of later releasing source code. Tim Sweeney has implied this issue has hindered potential releases of older Unreal Engine source code.

On the other hand, despite his technical admiration for the system, Carmack has several times over the years voiced a sceptical opinion about Linux as a gaming platform; for instance in 2013 he argued for emulation as the "proper technical direction for gaming on Linux" and in 2014 he voiced the opinion that Linux might be the biggest problem for the success of the Steam Machine.

Carmack contributes to charities and gaming communities. Some of the recipients of Carmack's charitable contributions include his former high school, promoters of open-source software, opponents of software patents, and game enthusiasts.

Carmack has continued to advise developers to be careful when depending on middleware, noting how it can limit the possibilities of later releasing source code, as well as maintaining good code quality and ensuring offline or third-party server support is available.

Personal life
Carmack was so successful at id that by mid-1994 he had purchased two Ferraris: a 328 and a Ferrari Testarossa. In 1997, he gave away one of his Ferraris (a 328 model) as a prize to Dennis Fong, the winner of the Quake tournament "Red Annihilation".

He met his now ex-wife Katherine Anna Kang, at the 1997 QuakeCon when she visited id's offices. As a bet, Kang challenged Carmack to sponsor the first All Female Quake Tournament if she was able to produce a significant number of participants. Carmack predicted a maximum of 25 participants, but there were 1,500. Carmack and Kang married on January 1, 2000, and planned a ceremony in Hawaii. Steve Jobs requested that they would postpone the ceremony so Carmack could attend the MacWorld Expo on January 5, 2000. Carmack declined and suggested making a video instead. Carmack and Kang had a son Ryan in 2004. Ryan made his first game Angry Face! when he was 9 years old. Their second child was born in November 2009. Carmack has a blog last updated in 2006 (previously a .plan), an active Twitter account, and also occasionally posts comments to Slashdot.

Carmack is divorced as of 2022. On May 26th 2022 he announced his divorce and how he met his partner though the VR Beat Saber games he would host via Twitter 

As a game developer, Carmack differed from many of his contemporaries by avoiding commitment to a final release date for any game he was developing. Instead, when asked for a release date on a new game, Carmack would usually reply that the game would be released "when it's done". Employees at Apogee, in their past years the publishers of games by id Software, adopted this business practice as well.  In 2019, as a guest on The Joe Rogan Experience, Carmack stated that his beliefs have changed over time: "I largely recant from that now." On Rage 6-year development time he says: "I think we should have done whatever it would have taken to ship it 2 years earlier". Carmack also reflected on the internal development of Quake in this regard and described it as "traumatic" and says id Software could have split the game into two parts and shipped it earlier.

Carmack supported the 2012 presidential campaign of Libertarian Ron Paul.

Carmack is an atheist.

During a conversation with Joe Rogan, Carmack revealed that he had trained in Brazilian Jiu Jitsu and Judo for several years as a hobby.

During his time at id Software, a medium pepperoni pizza would arrive for Carmack from Domino's Pizza almost every day, carried by the same delivery person for more than 15 years. Carmack had been such a regular customer that they continued to charge him 1995 prices.

On occasion he has commended the efforts of similarly focused programmers – first Ken Silverman, who wrote the Build engine for 3D Realms, and later with Tim Sweeney of Epic Games, who wrote the Unreal Engine.

Recognition

Games

References

Bibliography

External links

 
 
 
 

1970 births
Living people
20th-century American businesspeople
20th-century atheists
21st-century American businesspeople
21st-century atheists
Academy of Interactive Arts & Sciences Hall of Fame inductees
American aerospace businesspeople
American aerospace designers
American aerospace engineers
American atheists
American computer businesspeople
American male bloggers
American bloggers
American software engineers
American technology chief executives
American technology company founders
American video game designers
American video game programmers
Businesspeople from Kansas
Businesspeople from Texas
BAFTA fellows
Emmy Award winners
Facebook employees
Free software programmers
Game Developers Conference Lifetime Achievement Award recipients
Id Software people
People from Heath, Texas
People from Johnson County, Kansas
Texas Libertarians
Virtual reality pioneers